The 1929 Copa del Rey Final was the 29th final of the Copa del Rey, the Spanish football cup competition. RCD Español beat Real Madrid 2–1 and won their first title.

Match details

References

External links
linguasport.com
RSSSF.com

1929
Copa
Real Madrid CF matches
RCD Espanyol matches